Cristina Doboșan (born 25 May 1943) is a Romanian gymnast. She competed in six events at the 1964 Summer Olympics.

References

External links
 

1943 births
Living people
Romanian female artistic gymnasts
Olympic gymnasts of Romania
Gymnasts at the 1964 Summer Olympics
Sportspeople from Timișoara